Justin Dwinell (October 28, 1785 Shaftsbury, Bennington County, Vermont – September 17, 1850 Cazenovia, Madison County, New York) was an American lawyer and politician from New York.

Life
He was the son of Stephen Dwinell (1745–1801) and Susanna (Olin) Dwinell. He attended Williams College, and graduated from Yale College in 1808. Then he studied law in Troy with John D. Dickinson, was admitted to the bar in 1811, and commenced practice in Cazenovia. On September 12, 1813, he married Louise Whipple, and they had nine children, among them California Assemblyman John W. Dwinelle (1816–1881).

Justin Dwinell was member of the New York State Assembly (Madison Co.) in 1820–21 and 1822. He was First Judge of the Madison County Court from 1823 to 1828.

Dwinell was elected as a Crawford Democratic-Republican to the 18th United States Congress, holding office from March 4, 1823, to March 3, 1825. He was District Attorney of Madison County from 1837 to 1845.

He was buried at the Evergreen Cemetery in Cazenovia, New York.

His last name sometimes appears as "Dwinelle," and that is how it is spelled on his gravestone.

References

The New York Civil List compiled by Franklin Benjamin Hough (pages 71, 197f, 271, 361 and 376; Weed, Parsons and Co., 1858) [gives wrong listing on pg. 361]
Reminiscences of Louise S. Dwinelle at RootsWeb
The True Genealogy of the Dunnel and Dwinnell family of New England by Henry Gale Dunnel (pages 30 and 47)

External links
 

1785 births
1850 deaths
Williams College alumni
People from Cazenovia, New York
Yale College alumni
People from Shaftsbury, Vermont
New York (state) state court judges
County district attorneys in New York (state)
Members of the New York State Assembly
Democratic-Republican Party members of the United States House of Representatives from New York (state)
19th-century American politicians
19th-century American judges